Ban Lat is a district (amphoe) in the central part of Phetchaburi province, western Thailand.

Geography
Neighboring districts are (from the north clockwise) Khao Yoi, Mueang Phetchaburi, Tha Yang, Kaeng Krachan, and Nong Ya Plong of Phetchaburi Province.

History
Originally named Tha Chang (ท่าช้าง), it was renamed Ban Lat in 1939.

Economy
The production of palm sugar is a specialty of the district.

Administration
The district is divided into 18 sub-districts (tambons), which are further subdivided into 115 villages (mubans). Ban Lat is a sub-district municipality (thesaban tambon) and covers tambon Ban Lat. There are a further 14 tambon administrative organizations (TAO).

References

External links
amphoe.com

Ban Lat